Olivier Aertssen (born 7 August 2004) is a Dutch professional footballer who plays for Jong Ajax.

Club career 
Olivier Aertssen started his footballing career in amateur teams between Oirschot, Wolphaartsdijk and Kloetinge, before joining Sparta Rotterdam in 2018 and the Ajax Youth Academy a year later, as they had a partnership with the club from Rotterdam.

Starting the 2021–22 season as a regular with the Ajax youth team, most notably in the UEFA Youth League, Aertssen made his professional debut for Jong Ajax on the 10 January 2022, starting the 2–0 away Eerste Divisie win against Jong Utrecht as a center-back. By doing so he became the fourth youngest professional footballer from the province of Zeeland, just behind John Karelse, Erwin Nuytinck and Rick van Drongelen.

References

External links

2004 births
Living people
Dutch footballers
Netherlands youth international footballers
Association football defenders
Footballers from North Brabant
People from Veldhoven
Jong Ajax players
Eerste Divisie players